Brignone is an Italian surname. Notable people with the surname include:

Federica Brignone (born 1990), Italian World Cup alpine ski racer
Guido Brignone (1886–1959), Italian film director and actor
Lilla Brignone (1913–1984), Italian film and theater actress
Mercedes Brignone (1885–1967), Spanish-born Italian stage, film and television actress
Nicolas Brignone (born 1989), French para-sport athlete

Italian-language surnames